The 2015 Categoría Primera A season (officially known as the 2015 Liga Águila season for sponsorship reasons) was the 68th season of Colombia's top-flight football league. The season started on 30 January and concluded on 20 December.

20 teams competed against one another. Santa Fe came in as the defending champions having won the title in the 2014 season's Finalización tournament. Jaguares de Córdoba entered as champion of the 2014 Primera B, while Cortuluá and Cúcuta Deportivo were promoted as the top teams of their respective groups in the Promotion tournament.

Deportivo Cali won its ninth title in the Torneo Apertura after beating Independiente Medellín in the finals, while in the Torneo Finalización Atlético Nacional won its fifteenth title after beating Junior in the finals, thus surpassing Millonarios as the club with the most championships.

Format
Starting from this season, the league was expanded to 20 teams: 17 from last season plus Jaguares, the 2014 Primera B winners, and Cortuluá and Cúcuta Deportivo, the top two teams of a playoff tournament played in January 2015 between 8 Primera B sides to fill up the field of 20 teams. The Apertura and Finalización tournaments had a similar format and were divided into three stages: a First Stage which was contested on a single round-robin basis, with each team playing the other teams once and playing a regional rival once more for a total of 20 matches. The top eight teams after the twenty rounds advanced to a knockout round, where they were pitted into four ties to be played on a home-and-away basis, with the four winners advancing to the semifinals and the winner of each semifinal advancing to the final of the tournament, which were played on a home-and-away basis as well. The winner of the final was declared the tournament champion and will participate in the 2016 Copa Libertadores.

Teams

Stadia and locations 

a: Previously based in Pereira, played their first four home games at Estadio Hernán Ramírez Villegas.
b: Previously played at Estadio Álvaro Gómez Hurtado in Floridablanca.
c: Temporarily played its home games at Estadio Centenario in Armenia and Estadio Luis Antonio Duque in Girardot due to remodeling works at Estadio Guillermo Plazas Alcid.
d: Promoted through the Promotion tournament.
e: Temporarily played its home games at Estadio Metropolitano de Techo in Bogotá due to remodeling works at Estadio Manuel Murillo Toro.

Torneo Apertura

First stage
The First Stage began on 30 January and consisted of twenty rounds including a series of regional rivalries in the tenth round. It ended on 17 May with the top eight teams at the end of this stage advancing to the knockout stage.

Standings

Results

Knockout phase bracket

Quarterfinals

Notes

Semifinals

Finals

Top goalscorers

Source: DIMAYOR

Torneo Finalización

First stage
The First Stage began on 10 July and featured the same format used in the Torneo Apertura, with reversed fixtures. It ended on 22 November with the top eight teams at the end of this stage advancing to the knockout stage.

Standings

Results

Knockout phase bracket

Quarterfinals

Semifinals

Finals

Top goalscorers

Source: DIMAYOR

Relegation
A separate table is kept to determine the teams that get relegated to the Categoría Primera B for the next season. The table includes an average of all first stage games played for the current season and the previous two seasons.

Source: DIMAYORRules for classification: 1st average; 2nd goal difference; 3rd number of goals scored; 4th away goals scored.

Aggregate table

References

External links 
 DIMAYOR's official website 

Categoría Primera A seasons
Categoria Primera A season
1